Harriet Jane Hanson Robinson (February 8, 1825 – December 22, 1911) worked as a bobbin doffer in a Massachusetts cotton mill and was involved in a turnout, became a poet and author, and played an important role in the women's suffrage movement in the United States.

Early life
Harriet was the daughter of Harriet Browne Hanson and the carpenter William Hanson. Both parents were descended from early English settlers but without distinguished ancestors. Her elder brother was John Wesley Hanson (1823–1901), and she had two surviving younger brothers: Benjamin and William. Harriet's father died when she was five, which left his widow to support four young children.

Harriet's mother was determined to keep her family together, despite the difficulty in doing so.  Harriet later recalled in her autobiography Loom and Spindle  her mother's response after a neighbour had offered to adopt Harriet so that her mother had one less mouth to feed: "No; while I have one meal of victuals a day, I will not part with my children." She later wrote that her mother's words on that occasion stuck with her "because of the word 'victuals, whose meaning she wondered for a long time thereafter.

Initially, Mrs. Hanson ran a small store in Boston, Massachusetts, which sold food, candy, and firewood.  The family lived in the back room of the shop, all sharing one bed "two at the foot and three at the head," as Harriet would later recall.
At the invitation of Harriet's maternal aunt, Angeline Cudworth, also a widow, the family moved to Lowell, Massachusetts, a center of the textile industry.

Lowell was a planned mill town. Under the Lowell System, the company recruited young women (15-35) from New England farms to work in the mills. The companies built boardinghouses managed by older women, often widows to provide meals and safe places to live. Churches and cultural organizations offered lectures, concerts, reading rooms, improvement circles and other cultural and educational opportunities. Another attraction were good cash wages compared to domestic work and teaching, which paid much less.

Mill worker 

Mrs. Hanson obtained a job as a boardinghouse keeper for the Tremont Mills in Lowell, Massachusetts. During the summer of 1836, Harriet started to work part-time at the Tremont Mills. By her own account, she wanted to work to be able to earn money for herself, and the experience was good for her. However, there may have been an element of necessity since her mother earned little money from running the boarding house. Her job, which paid $2 per week, was as a "doffer," who replaced full bobbins with empty ones. The job took only a quarter of each hour, and during the free periods, the boys and girls could play or read or even go home for a while.

In 1836, the Lowell Mill Girls organized another strike, or "turn out" as they called them. The first strike had been in 1834 over a 15% cut in wages. The second strike was over an increase in board charges that was equivalent to a 12.5% cut in wages. To Harriet, who was eleven, it was her first "turn out." In her autobiography, she recounted it with pride:

Harriet was harming her own mother by striking since her mother would have benefited from the increase in boarding charges. Harriet did not realize that until she was older.

As a consequence of the turn out, several of the mills reversed the increase in charges, and the boarding system was reviewed on the grounds that since it was the principal inducement for young women and girls to come and work at the mills in the first place, it must not be having the desired effect if they were so dissatisfied that they struck.  However, the turn out organizers were fired from their jobs, as was Harriet's mother, which Harriet depicted in her autobiography as an act of petty revenge for Harriet's own actions.

Harriet continued to work in the mills after the turn out was over and graduated to tending a spinning frame and then becoming a "drawing-in girl," one of the better jobs in the mill.
The drawing room was relatively quiet, away from the spinning and weaving machinery.

The drawing-in girl took over after the warp threads had been wound onto the take-up beam and drew each thread through the harness and reeds using a long metal hook.
She could sit on a stool or a chair as she worked.
Once that was complete, the beam would be delivered to the weaving room.
The pay was on a piecework basis and so Harriet could work at her own pace, and while the looms were operating, she could
find a quiet room away from the machinery in which she was able to read.

Education

Harriet had obtained an elementary education before she started work in the mill.
While she worked as a doffer, she also attended evening classes.

At the age of 15 she left the mills for two years to study French, Latin, and English grammar and composition at Lowell High School. She studied in a wooden school room in a building that had a butcher's shop on the ground floor.

The titles of two of her compositions have survived: "Poverty Not Disgraceful" and "Indolence and Industry", 
reflecting her opinion that there was nothing wrong with the honest labor of poor people.

Harriet returned to the mills and worked there until 1848 but, in her spare time, participated in literary groups in Lowell. 

Lowell was rich in educational and cultural opportunities for women at the time. There were libraries and bookstores, evening schools and lectures, concerts and balls.
Two of the first magazines written by women were published in the town, the Lowell Offering and The New England Offering.  
Betsey Guppy Chamberlain (1797–1886), one of Harriet's companions in the mills, became a noted contributor of sketches and stories to the Lowell Offering.
Harriet said that "the fame of The Lowell Offering caused the mill girls to be considered very desirable for wives; and that young men came from near and far to pick and choose for themselves, and generally with good success."
Harriet also wrote and published poetry, and it was through this that she met her future husband, William Robinson, who worked as an editor at the Lowell Journal, which published some of her work.

Marriage

Harriet married William Stevens Robinson (1818–1876) on Thanksgiving Day in 1848, when she was 23. Also from a poor background, Robinson was a writer for a newspaper and a supporter of the Free Soil Party, which opposed the expansion of slavery into the western territories and made it hard for him to keep a job.
During the early years of her marriage, Harriet was not interested in women's rights.
In her early writings, she described the pleasure of having a husband to handle worldly problems,  and her job was to take care of him and said that for that reason she did not want to vote.   
Harriet later adopted the women's rights cause, after her husband had taken it up.
The couple would have four children, one of whom died young, and they also looked after Harriet's mother. Often, they struggled to make ends meet.

In 1858, the couple moved to Malden, a new residential suburb five miles from Boston and bought a house two blocks from the railway station. That was to be Harriet's home for the rest of her life.

At first, Robinson struggled to earn a living as a journalist.
The couple had a large garden, grew fruit and vegetables, and made some money by raising chickens and selling the eggs.

In 1862 Robinson held a well-paying job as clerk of the Massachusetts House of Representatives for 11 years.

In 1868 Harriet joined the American Woman's Suffrage Organization, led by Lucy Stone, and founded the Malden women's club.
Robinson was forced out of his job by the politician Benjamin Butler, and in 1876 died after a long illness.

Her daughter, Hattie, served as assistant clerk of the Massachusetts House of Representatives in 1872, being the first woman to hold such a position. Another daughter Elizabeth was considered to be a pioneer in introducing kindergarten to Connecticut.

Later life
As a widow, Harriet Robinson rented out rooms to support herself, her three daughters and her aged mother. She wrote several books, including a biography of her husband, and became increasingly active in the women's suffrage movement. 
Harriet's book Loom and Spindle (1898) portrayed the industrial town of Lowell in her childhood and youth as a time of great opportunity for mill girls, who learned the discipline of labor and gained broader ideas about the world from their experiences. The book continues to be read more than 100 years after it was published.

Harriet and her daughter Harriet Lucy Robinson Shattuck organized the National Woman Suffrage Association of Massachusetts, associated with Susan B. Anthony's organization, and Harriet Robinson made the opening address at the 1881 Boston Convention of the organization. They also helped Julia Ward Howe to organize the New England Women's Club. Harriet Robinson corresponded extensively with the suffrage movement leaders Elizabeth Cady Stanton and Susan B. Anthony. When the National Woman Suffrage Association opened on 26 May 1881 at the Tremont Temple in Boston, Harriet Robinson welcomed the delegates and guests. At this session she offered the following resolution: "Whereas, We believe that it is not safe to trust the great question of woman's political rights solely to the legislature, or to the voters of the state, therefore Resolved, That it is the duty of the women of Massachusetts to organize an active work, to secure a sixteenth amendment to the United States Constitution." Harriet Robinson wrote enthusiastically in 1881,

Harriet never took a theoretical position on women's rights and may have been largely motivated by an ambition to advance in society, which the movement offered. However, she became a formidable advocate of suffrage in her writings and as a public speaker.

The poet Lucy Larcom, a friend of Harriet who had also worked in the mills as a child, wrote of her, "Mrs. Robinson is deeply interested in all the movements, which tend to the advancement of women, and uses her pen and her voice freely in their behalf. She was the first woman to speak before the Select Committee on Woman Suffrage in Congress, and has spoken for the cause before the legislature of her own State, where she is not only a citizen, but a vote as far as the law allows."

Additionally, Harriet contributed to the fourteenth annual report of the Massachusetts Bureau of Statistics of Labor, which was published in 1883. Here is an excerpt from the annual report written by Harriet Robinson:

They [the mill girls] went forth from their Alma Mater, the Lowell Factory, carrying with them the independence, the self-reliance taught in that hard school, and they have done their little part towards performing the useful labor of life. Into whatever vocation they entered they have made practical use of the habits of industry and perseverance learned during those early years. Skilled labor teaches something not to be found in books or in colleges. Their early experience developed their characters... and helped them to fight well the battle of life.

Harriet lived to the age of 86 and died at home in Malden on 22 December 1911.

Bibliography
Although she published several books, Harriet Robinson did not make money from her writings, which she published at her own expense.

Books

In anthologies

Notes

References

Sources

Further reading

External links
 

1825 births
1911 deaths
Writers from Boston
American suffragists
Textile workers
Wikipedia articles incorporating text from A Woman of the Century
19th-century American non-fiction writers
19th-century American women writers